Głuchówek may refer to the following places:
Głuchówek, Greater Poland Voivodeship (west-central Poland)
Głuchówek, Łódź Voivodeship (central Poland)
Głuchówek, Masovian Voivodeship (east-central Poland)